Leon Cordero is a 1996 Philippine action film co-written and directed by Baldo Marro. The film stars Raymart Santiago as the title role.

Cast
 Raymart Santiago as Leon Cordero
 Jennifer Mendoza as Marissa
 Lailani Navarro as Lilet
 Eddie Gutierrez as Don Salazar
 Marita Zobel as Meding
 King Gutierrez as Totoy Sputnik
 Dick Israel as Waray
 Manjo del Mundo as Claudio
 Ray Ventura as Turing
 Pen Medina as Tito Miroy
 Berting Labra as Tito Ambo
 Arabelle Cadocio as Raquel
 Boy Alvarez as Antik
 Angela Morena as Adiang

References

External links

1996 films
1996 action films
Filipino-language films
Philippine action films
GMA Pictures films
OctoArts Films films